Equisetum sylvaticum, the wood horsetail, is a horsetail (family Equisetaceae) native to the Northern Hemisphere, occurring in North America and Eurasia. Because of its lacy appearance, it is considered among the most attractive of the horsetails.

Botanical description 
This perennial horsetail has erect, hollow stems that grow from 30 to 60 cm in length and from 1–4 mm thick. The branches themselves are compound and delicate, occurring in whorls and drooping downward. There are generally 12 or more branches per whorl. Fertile stems are at first tan-to-brown and unbranched, but later become like the sterile stems, which are more highly branched and green. All the stems have 10-18 spiny vertical ridges that contain silica spicules. The leaves are scales fused into sheaths that cover the stems and branches. These spiny leaves are larger and looser on the fertile stems.

The fertile stems are shorter than the others; on these develop the cones that bear the spore casings. The leaves develop on the fertile stems and the stems lengthen; then the cones open to release their spores. The cones then drop off. This process takes a few weeks. All the stems may continue to grow until fall and generally die back over winter.

Reproduction 
This plant reproduces by spores, but its primary means of reproduction is done vegetatively by rhizomes. These rhizome systems are deep and extensive, as well as extremely long-lived. These creeping rhizomes occasionally produce tubers, and often outweigh the above-ground growth by 100 to 1.

Habitat 
These horsetails are commonly found in wet or swampy forest, open woodlands, and meadow areas. The species name sylvaticum is Latin for "of the forests", emphasizing that the wood horsetail is most commonly found in forested habitats. The plant is an indicator of boreal and cool-temperate climates, and very moist to wet, nitrogen-poor soils.

Taxonomy 
Linnaeus was the first to describe wood horsetail with the binomial Equisetum sylvaticum in his Species Plantarum of 1753.

References 

 Borealforest.com entry for Wood Horsetail
 The Wood Horsetail 

sylvaticum
Plants described in 1753
Taxa named by Carl Linnaeus
Flora of North America
Flora of Europe
Flora of Asia